Mandu is a small village in the Democratic Republic of Congo.

Populated places in Nord-Ubangi